The  2017 Estonian Small Cup was the 8th season of the Estonian amateur football knockout tournament. The tournament began in March 2017, and the final took place in September 2017 at the A. Le Coq Arena, Tallinn. Tartu FC Merkuur were the defending champions. The 2017 Cup was won by Paide Linnameeskond III.

First Round (1/64)
The draw was made by Estonian Football Association on 7 March 2017.
League level of the club in the brackets.
Rahvaliiga RL (people's league) is a league organized by Estonian Football Association, but not part of the main league system.

Byes
These teams were not drawn and secured a place in the second round without playing:
 II Liiga (4): FC Nõmme United, Viimsi JK II, SK Imavere, TJK Legion, Maardu Linnameeskond II, Viljandi JK Tulevik U21, Tartu FC Merkuur
 III Liiga (5): Pirita JK Reliikvia, Kuusalu JK Rada, Ambla Vallameeskond, EMÜ SK, Tartu FC Helios, Kristiine JK, JK Kernu Kajakas, Tallinna FC Hell Hunt, Tallinna FC Castovanni Eagles, Harju JK Laagri, FC Kose, Navi Vutiselts, Tallinna FC Eston Villa, FC Järva-Jaani, FC Tartu, FC Jõgeva Wolves, Läänemaa JK Haapsalu, Pakri SK Alexela, Tartu JK Tammeka U19, Rumori Calcio Tallinn, Pärnu JK Poseidon
 IV Liiga (6): FC Maardu Aliens, Tallinna FC Olympic Olybet, Anija JK, Põlva FC Lootos, Haapsalu JK, Valga FC Warrior, Tallinna FC TransferWise, Pärnu JK Poseidon II, FC Toompea, Kohila Püsivus, Maarjamäe FC Igiliikur, Tallinna FC Reaal
 Rahvaliiga (RL): AC Rapla, FC Puhkus Mehhikos

Second Round (1/32)
The draw was made by Estonian Football Association on 6 April 2017.
League level of the club in the brackets.
Rahvaliiga RL (people's league) is a league organized by Estonian Football Association, but not part of the main league system.

Third Round (1/16)
The draw was made by Estonian Football Association on 15 May 2017.
League level of the club in the brackets.
Rahvaliiga RL (people's league) is a league organized by Estonian Football Association, but not part of the main league system.

Fourth Round (1/8)
The draw was made by Estonian Football Association on 13 June 2017.

League level of the club in the brackets.

Quarter-finals
The draw was made on 30 June 2017.

Semi-finals
The draw was made on 7 August 2017.

Final
Two finalists were two III Liiga teams JK Retro and Paide Linnameeskond III.

See also
 2017 Meistriliiga
 2017 Esiliiga
 2017 Esiliiga B
 2016-17 Estonian Cup
 2017-18 Estonian Cup

References

External links
 Official website 

2017
Cup